Louis Newman may refer to:

 Louis E. Newman,  professor of religious studies
 Louis Israel Newman (1893–1972), Reform rabbi and author